Watchdog journalism is a form of investigative journalism where journalists, authors or publishers of a news publication fact-check and interview political and public figures to increase accountability in democratic governance systems.

Role 
Watchdog journalists gather information about the actions of people in power and inform the public in order to hold elected officials to account.  This requires maintaining a certain professional distance from people in power. Watchdog journalists are different from propagandist journalists in that they report from an independent, nongovernmental perspective. Due to watchdog journalism's unique features, it also often works as the fourth estate. The general issues, topics, or scandals that watchdog journalists cover are political corruption and any wrongdoing of people in power such as government officials or corporation executives.

Three dimensions of operationalization 
The role of the press to be a "watchdog" and monitor a government's actions has been one of the fundamental components of a democratic society. Ettema and Glasser (1998) argue that watchdog journalism's most important role is that their “stories implicitly demand the response of public officials.” Playing a role as a Fourth Estate, watchdog journalism is able to force governments to meet their obligations to the public by publicizing issues such as scandals, corruption, and failure to address needs of the public. Mellado (2015) identified and developed three dimensions of operationalization of the watchdog role: the intensity of scrutiny, journalistic voice, and the source of news event.

Intensity of scrutiny: Watchdog journalism has a few levels of scrutiny in terms of its reporting style. First of all, at the lowest level, questions and interrogations are a key way to investigate people with power. At a next level, denunciation is still not necessarily needed. But it consists of more obvious and somewhat aggressive questions and interrogations. Lastly, the highest level of scrutiny involves the strategy which is designed for people who are investigated to confess their wrongdoing, which requires a variety of evidence of wrongdoing to be used.
Journalistic voice: Watchdog journalism needs a few types of voices which are required to address the scrutiny. Specifically, journalists' own voice or a third party's voice is the most general type. In the case of a detached orientation of watchdog journalism, it is likely to use a third party's voice to question, criticize, and denounce wrongdoings what people with power do rather than using journalists' voices.
Source of news event: There is a specific type of event that watchdog journalism is interested in to question, criticize, and denounce. Specifically, not only corruptions of the relationship between people with power and media, but also issues about judiciary processes or external investigations are likely to be handled by a detached orientation of watchdog journalism.

Predictors of watchdog role performance 

Depending on the differences in a social and organizational level, a performance of the journalistic role also changes. In turn, there are a few factors that are likely to have an influence over the type of watchdog performance in the journalism.

Democracy: Watchdog journalism can work effectively in well-established democratic countries, owing to the high level of the freedom of the press, journalistic autonomy and independence. A low level of press censorship, state intervention, and institutional control are ensured at the same time.
Audience orientation: Audience orientation is one of the factors that affects the performance of journalistic roles. For instance, in China, market newspapers are more likely to play a role as the watchdog journalism than an official newspaper, which is supposed to publicize corruptions of people with power such as how they misuse existing policy or law, does.  At this point, there is a huge difference in reporting styles between popular press and elite press.
Media political leaning: The political orientation of the journalism is closely associated to the performance of the watchdog role. To be specific, according to what Mellado et al. (2017) found in five Latin American countries, the media that serves the interests of the right or moderates is less likely to work as a watchdog  than the media serving interests of the left. In addition, biased tendency of the media has a great impact on the coverage of the political issues or scandals.
News beats: The performance of the watchdog journalism is influenced by journalistic specialization. For instance, based on what Reich (2012) found, journalists who deal with political issues are highly likely to act as watchdogs than ones who cover business issues. Similar tendency appears in other countries including China, Chile, and Spain. To be specific, in these countries, watchdog journalism can be found in the field that covers the political scandals, while business and economy journalists are less likely to act as watchdog.

Detached watchdog 

Detached watchdog journalism, one of the four identified journalism cultures, puts emphasis on neutrality, fairness, objectivity, and impartiality. This is the most familiar and pervasive type of a few forms of watchdog journalism. Detached watchdog refers to observing issues in a detached manner. So it pursues a different approach in scrutinizing wrongdoings and publicizing them to the public from what interventionist approach does. In addition this is the reason why characteristics including neutrality, fairness, objectivity, and impartiality are important. But it does not mean that watchdog journalists do not take a skeptical and critical action. The detached watchdog journalism is predominant especially in the western countries such as Germany, the United States, Austria, and Switzerland.

In the detached approach, the most predominant form of watchdog journalism, criticism and question which are done by sources are the least intense levels of scrutiny. Since the detached watchdog journalism generally consists of third parties (or sources) that question, criticize, and denounce wrongdoings, it tends to play a passive role in terms of investigating people in power. In this regard, one of the characteristics that distinguishes between detached and the other type of approaches named interventionist watchdog journalism is the type of event that journalists handle. The type of event that prompts the journalists to act as a watchdog to scrutinizing people in power by questioning and criticizing is different based on the approaches. Within liberal media systems, the phenomenon that journalists are highly likely to take the detached approach of the watchdog journalism can be often seen because of liberal media systems’ a few unique features such as the factuality and objectivity.

Indicators of detached orientation and operationalization 

 Questioning by sources: People other than journalists can question people in power by expressing opinions and giving statements or quotes.
 Criticism by sources: People other than journalists can criticize those with power can through expressing negative opinions or giving a statement or quote.
 Denunciation by sources: People other than journalists can provide a testimony or an evidence about something that people with power do and say.
 External investigation: Corruptions, scandals, or issues of people in power are often scrutinized and covered by the news media even though journalists do not handle them directly.
 Questioning by the journalist: Journalists can work as a watchdog by checking the legitimacy and integrity of people in power's action.
 Criticism by the journalist: The journalists are allowed to judge and condemn what people in power do by making assertions.
 Denunciation by the journalist: The journalists can denounce and accuse something that is hidden illegally by people in power by making assertions.
 Reporting of conflict: The journalists can bring a source, an institution, or people in power that have to be scrutinized to the table.

In practice 

Historically, a lot of examples have proven that watchdog journalism has the power to dislodge corrupt people in power from their positions. One of the most famous examples is how coverage of the Watergate scandal, done by watchdog journalists Bob Woodward and Carl Bernstein, led to resignation of the U.S President Richard Nixon on August 9, 1974.

Washington Post's coverage of Watergate scandal 

The Watergate scandal was one of the biggest political scandals in the United States. It involved Richard Nixon, the 37th president of the United States and led him to resign.

This scandal stemmed from the exposure of a burglary of the Democratic National Committee headquarters in the Watergate Office Building, Washington D.C. committed by 5 former FBI and CIA agents, who were paid to plant a bug to help Nixon's re-election campaign. After the 5 were arrested, investigative journalists Bernstein and Woodward gradually exposed more details of the plot in a series of stories in The Washington Post.  Eventually in 1973 the U.S. House of Representatives decide to commence an impeachment process against Nixon. Audio tapes that Nixon had secretly made of events in the Oval Office revealed that Nixon tried to cover up details of the crime.  As a result, the impeachment against Richard Nixon was approved by the House judiciary committee. He resigned from the presidency on August 9, 1974.

The role of Washington Post as watchdog journalism in the case of Watergate scandal 
The case of Watergate scandal is the most famous example showing the role of watchdog journalism, how it works and even further, its impact. The media, especially, The Washington Post, significantly contributed to highlight the fact that there is the rotten connection between the breaking in the Watergate Office and Richard Nixon's re-election committee. In addition, its coverage led to an explosion of publicity and public attention. To cover the scandal, anonymous sources became the main material that The Washington Post heavily relied on. Specifically, the Washington Post's investigative journalists named Bob Woodward and Carl Bernstein played a really important role. They uncovered information and evidence that proved the agents' break-in to plant a bug and attempts to conceal it which result in the intervention of the Justice Department, FBI, CIA, and the White House. In addition, they conducted interviews with a witness named Judy Hoback Miller. He was the book keep who worked at the Richard Nixon's re-election committee and had an evidence showing how Richard Nixon and his committee mishandled the funds and destroyed the records, the evidence of conspiracy. The most valuable and reliable anonymous sources came from person who did not reveal his identity at the time. He was called Deep Throat by Woodward and Bernstein. Every meeting between investigative journalists of The Washington Post and Deep Throat was held secretly. And through these meetings, involvement of the Richard Nixon, his committee and the White House was revealed. Later, it was also revealed that Deep Throat, the anonymous informant, is the deputy director of the FBI during 1970s named William Mark Felt, Sr.

Crisis in watchdog journalism  

Journalism's role as a watchdog is in danger of disappearing in a lot of societies and countries across the world. Basically, watchdog journalism has to force people in power, for instance government officials, to take a responsibility of their actions that affect public's way of living. However, since local news media and newspaper have faced closing or consolidation, it is hard to see journalism that watches those in power. To be specific, in the case of the United States, the phenomenon of disappearing a local newspaper has happened in more than 1,400 cities since 15 years ago according to an Associated Press's research which was conducted through data gathered by the University of North Carolina. And those cities are where watchdog journalism that reports issues and problems caused by actions of a corrupt people in power is necessarily needed. As a result, several negative outcomes for the community has been brought. Foremost, rotten actions of people in power such as politicians are unable to be criticized and watched. This is because there is no transparency that can solve problems and achieve a healthy democracy.

In addition, disappearing of a local newspaper that plays a role as a watchdog journalism is related to putting a financial problem directly on members in a community. Based on the research conducted by the University of Illinois at Chicago and the University of Notre Dame, it is found that increasing in borrowing costs after a local newspaper is closed has a close connection with municipal government. It indicates that the absence of a watchdog journalism leaves the public out of a discussion and helps people in power such as government officials to refuse to meet public scrutiny. People in power are highly likely to engage in wasteful spending because there is no journalism that watches and criticizes their actions, decisions, and policies. To simply put, if there is no investigative journalism, important issues that public must know are not covered. So instead of reporting on fraud, abuse, and waste, useless and meaningless topics will be handled as if they are the only problem that a community faces. For instance, a corruption scandal which is related to various public infrastructures such as hospital that require more resources with a high quality to provide better service to public will be less likely to be told.

An extreme example is provided by the City of Bell scandal:  Bell, California is a modest income community of roughly 37,000 in Los Angeles County.  In 1999 or shortly thereafter the local newspaper died.  In 2010 the Los Angeles Times found that the city was near bankruptcy in spite of having atypically high property tax rates.  Part-time city council members collected almost $100,000 a year.  The Chief of Police's salary was over $450,000, roughly double that of the Los Angeles Chief of Police, whose department included almost 10,000 officers vs. 48 for Bell.  The city manager made almost $800,000, almost double that of the President of the United States.

Watchdog journal sites by country 
These sites follow Watchdog Journalism: 

Albania

 Balkan Insight
 BIRN

Algeria

 El Khabar

Argentina

 GIJN
 Grupo Clarin

Australia

 Nick McKenzie

Bangladesh

 The Watchdog Post
 Rumor Scanner
 Netra News

India

 Dfrac
 The Quint

Japan

 goohoo

Pakistan

 Soch

See also 
 Fake news
 Guardian Project (software)
 Investigative journalism
 Journalistic interventionism
 Muckraking
 Whistleblowing

References

External links
 Nieman Watchdog: Questions the Press Should Ask – Official site (Nieman Foundation for Journalism at Harvard University).